South Carolina Highway 292 (SC 292) is a  state highway in the U.S. state of South Carolina. The highway connects Duncan and the Inman area, via Lyman.

Route description
SC 292 begins at an intersection with SC 290 (West Main Street) in Duncan, within Spartanburg County. It travels to the east-northeast, crosses railroad tracks, and curves to the northeast. It crosses over the Middle Tyger River and enters Lyman. The highway crosses railroad tracks before passing Lyman Park. At Groce Road, SC 292 turns left and travels to the north-northwest. Three blocks later, it intersects U.S. Route 29 (US 29). The two highways travel concurrently to the west for one block, crossing railroad tracks along the way. The two highways intersect the western terminus of SC 129. SC 129/SC 292 travels to the north-northeast and immediately begin curving to the northeast. The only intersection along their short concurrency is with the southern terminus of SC 358 (Holly Springs Road). SC 292 travels to the north-northeast and crosses the North Tyger River before leaving the city limits. It curves back to the north-northeast and crosses Lake Cooley. It crosses Lawsons Fork Creek and enters Inman Mills. The highway travels southeast of Inman Mills Park. At the intersection with US 176 (Asheville Highway), the highway leaves Inman Mills and enters Inman. It curves to the northwest and turns right onto Prospect Street. Just after leaving town, it crosses Greene Creek. It crosses over Meadow Creek just before an interchange with Interstate 26 (I-26). A short distance later, it meets its eastern terminus, an intersection with SC 9 (Boiling Springs Road).

Major intersections

Lyman connector route

South Carolina Highway 292 Connector (SC 292 Conn.) is a  connector route that mostly exists within the east-central part of Lyman. There is a relatively short portion in nearby Wellford. It is an unsigned highway.

It begins at an intersection with the SC 292 mainline, where that highway turns left off of Spartanburg Road and onto Groce Road. The connector route takes Spartanburg Road to the northeast. Just after an intersection with the northern terminus of Ridge Road and the southern terminus of Elliott Road, it begins a curve to the southeast. During that curve it leaves Lyman and enters Wellford. At Astor Street, it turns left and takes that street to the northeast for one block, to its eastern terminus, an intersection with U.S. Route 29 (US 29).

See also

References

External links

SC 292 South Carolina Hwy Index

292
Transportation in Spartanburg County, South Carolina